Bruck Dawit is an Ethiopian–American musician, music producer, record mixer, composer and author.

Musical 
Bruck Dawit and his writing partner the singer France Gall, wrote the musical Résiste. The musical had its first representation on November 4, 2015, at the Palais des Sports auditorium in Paris, France.

Discography

Artists and record company list 
 Los Angeles
 Michael Jackson, Michael Jackson for Sony Music
 Robert Vaughn, Sony Music 
 Penny Ford, Sony Music 
 Toad the Wet Sprocket, Sony Music 
 Journey, Columbia Records 
 Trisha Covington, Sony Music 

New York
 Bruce Springsteen, Bruce Springsteen with Sony Music 
 Tony Bennett, Sony Music 
 Bebe & Cece Winans, Sony Music 
 Rodney Crowell, Sony Music 
 Prefab Sprout, Sony Music 
 Tashan, Sony Music 
 Shawn Colvin, Sony Music 
 Sophie Hawkins, Sony Music 
 Trey Lorenz, Sony Music 
 The Darling Buds, Sony Music 
 Brenda Kahn, Sony Music 
 Darden Smith, Sony Music 
 Booker T. & the M.G.'s, Sony Music 
 Joe Public, Sony Music 
 Queen Sarah Saturday, Sony Music 
 The Blue Up?, Sony Music 
 Chris Whitley, Sony Music 
 Dionne Farris, Sony Music 
 Janet LaValley, Sony Music 
 The Candy Butchers, Sony Music 
 Harry Connick Jr., Sony Music 
 The presidents of the United States of America, Sony Music 
 Chynna Phillips, Sony Music 

 United Kingdom
 Queen, EMI Records 
 Martyn Joseph, Sony Music 
 The Kinks, Columbia Records 
 The Real People, Sony Music 
 New Model Army, Sony Music 
 Pauline Henry, Sony Music 
 Big Audio Dynamite, Sony Music 
 Marillion, EMI Records 

 Prince, Paisley Park Records Warner Bros. Records
 Eric Clapton, Warner Bros. Records
 Mick Jagger, Atlantic Records
 The Rolling Stones, Atlantic Records
 France Gall, CMBM Warner Music France
 Debbie Harry & Elvis Costello Jazz Passengers
 Manic Street Preachers, Columbia Records
 Jeff Buckley, Jeff Buckley Sony Music
 David Byrne, Luaka Bop Warner Bros. Records
 Super Junky Monkey, Sony Music Japan
 The Smithereens, RCA Records
 Tevin Campbell, Prince & Kirk Johnson for Warner Bros. Records
 Color Me Badd, Giant Records
 David Wilcox, A&M Records
 Eve Gallagher, Frankie Knuckles Def Mix Productions
 Miles Jaye, Virgin Records
 Skye, Atlantic Records
 Adeva, Smack Productions
 Jody Watley, Atlantic Records
 Roxette, Capitol Records
 Robyn Springer, Cardiac Records
 Raining Violets, Daou Records
 The Screaming Jets, Universal Music U.S.
 Gontiti, Sony Music Japan
 Southern Sons, RCA Records
 Belly, Sire Records
 Regina Belle, Columbia Records
 The Judybats, Sire Records
 The Boo Radleys, Sony Music
 The Ocean Blue, Sire Records
 Paul Westerberg, Warner Bros. Records
 Matthew Sweet, Columbia Records
 Steve Perry, Sony Music
 Michael McDermot, SBK Records
 Michael Been, Qwest Records
 Andru Donalds, Capitol Records
 James McMurtry, Columbia Records
 Radionettes, Sony Music, Norway
 The Beggars, Island Records
 David Byrne & Selena, David Byrne for Atlantic Records
 Toshi Kubota & Caron Wheeler, Sony Music, Japan
 Robben Ford, GRP Records
 The Greenberry Woods, Sire Records
 The Fledglings, TVT Records
 Skydiggers, Sony Music, Canada
 Christine Anu, Sony Music, Australia
 Amanda Marshall, Sony Music, Canada

Remix 
1991: Michael Jackson, In The Closet (Remix), Sony Music
1992: Darling Buds, Long Day in the Universe (Remix), Chaos Recordings, Columbia Records
1995: Shawn Colvin, Every Little Thing He Does Is Magic (Remix), Columbia Records
1997: France Gall, Résiste (Remix), CMBM Warner Music France 
2002: Michel Berger, La Fille Au Sax, Pour Me Comprendre, CMBM Warner Music France
2004: France Gall, Privée D'Amour (Remix), Evidemment, CMBM Warner Music France

Performance, Remix, Production and Technical 
1991: Brinca (12")	Biscayne Europa (BE)	 	
1992: Working Mother, Epic Records		
1992: Stars And Stripes, Generation Terrorists US Mix, Epic/Sony
1993: Live at Sin-é, Columbia
1993: Feed The Tree/Star, Sire, Reprise Records
1993: There She Goes, So I Married An Axe Murderer, Chaos Recordings	 
1993: For The Sake of Love, Columbia, Columbia, Chaos Recordings		
1993: I'm Ready, Qwest Records, Warner Bros. Records		
1993: Contemporary Jeep Music, Rowdy Records	 	
1993: Being There, Epic	
1994: Wild Seed, Wild Flower, Columbia,
1994: Call Me, Columbia	 	
1994: Why You Wanna Play Me Out? (MHB Mix), Trisha Covington, Columbia	 	
1994: MTV Unplugged, Columbia, Columbia
1994: David Byrne, Luaka Bop, Sire, Warner Bros. Records	
1995: Spool Forka Dish, Columbia 	
1995: Don Juan DeMarco, David Byrne, Warner Bros. Records, Film Music
1995: Amanda Marshall, Epic
1996: Secret Garden, Bruce Springsteen, Jerry Maguire Film Music	
1996: France, CMBM Warner Music France	 
1996: Privée D'amour, CMBM Warner Music France	
1996: France Gall, Plus Haut, CMBM Warner Music France	
1997: France Gall, France Gall, Concert Privé/Concert Public, CMBM Warner Music France
2002: Michel Berger, Lumière Du Jour, CMBM Warner Music France	
2004: France Gall, Évidemment, CMBM Warner Music France	
2005: France Gall, Pleyel,	CMBM Warner Music France		
2006: Tony Bennett, MTV Unplugged,	Sony BMG	 
2012:  Double Jeu En Studio Le Making Of, Berger/Gall, Double Jeu, WEA Music
2013: Message Personnel (Show TV) Françoise Hardy, CMBM Warner Music France		
Unknown: Martyn Joseph, Being There, Epic

References

External links 
 Billboard publié par Nielsen Business Media, Inc. (1) 
 Billboard publié par Nielsen Business Media, Inc. (2) 
 Billboard publié par Nielsen Business Media, Inc. (3)

Ethiopian musicians
Year of birth missing (living people)
Living people
Audio production engineers